Gladiador romano (English: Roman Gladiator) is a sculpture by José María Labastida. The Museo Nacional de Arte in Mexico City has a marble version, and a bronze copy is installed in Alameda Central.

References

External links

 

1830 sculptures
Alameda Central
Bronze sculptures in Mexico
Marble sculptures
Nude sculptures
Sculptures of men in Mexico
Statues in Mexico City